Hobden is a surname.  Notable people with the surname include:

 Dennis Hobden (1920–1995), British politician
 Matt Hobden (1993–2016), English cricketer
 Phil Hobden (born 1976), English film director and producer

See also
 Holden (surname)